William Prideaux Courtney (1845–1913) was a British biographer and civil servant. Writing as W. P. C., he was a contributor to the first edition of the Dictionary of National Biography. He was the brother of Leonard Courtney, 1st Baron Courtney of Penwith (1832-1918) and John Mortimer Courtney (1838–1920). As an administrator he worked for the Ecclesiastical Commissioners.

Works

 
 
 
 Courtney, William Prideaux (1894). English whist and English whist players. Richard Bentley and Son.
 Courtney, William Prideaux; Smith, David Nichol (ed.) (1915). A bibliography of Samuel Johnson. Clarendon Press.

References

External links

English biographers
1845 births
1913 deaths
People from Penzance
21st-century biographers
20th-century biographers
Contributors to the Dictionary of National Biography
Contributors to the Encyclopædia Britannica